The OMEGA Heavyweight Championship is the top singles title in the Organization of Modern Extreme Grappling Arts (OMEGA) independent professional wrestling promotion. The title's original run lasted from 1997 to 2000, before being recommissioned at OMEGA's Night of a Champion on February 28, 2015, crowning Jeff Hardy as the first champion since 2000.

Title history

Combined reigns 

See also
OMEGA Championship Wrestling

References

External links
 Omega Heavyweight Championship

Heavyweight wrestling championships
OMEGA Championship Wrestling championships
Global Force Wrestling championships